Ellisbridge is one of the 182 Legislative Assembly constituencies of Gujarat state in India. It is part of Ahmedabad district and is a segment of Ahmedabad West Lok Sabha constituency.

List of segments

This assembly seat represents the following segments,

 Ahmedabad City Taluka (Part) – Ahmedabad
 Municipal Corporation (Part) Ward No. – 7, 8, 9, 10.

Members of Legislative Assembly

Election results

2022

2017

2012

2007

2002

1998

1995

See also
 List of constituencies of the Gujarat Legislative Assembly
 Ahmedabad district

References

External links
 

Assembly constituencies of Gujarat
Government of Ahmedabad